Union Cafe is the fifth and final studio album by the Penguin Cafe Orchestra, released in 1993 under the Zopf label. The album was originally released only as a CD and cassette. It was never released on vinyl until 2017, when a double LP edition was finally released under the Erased Tapes label to commemorate the 20th anniversary since Simon Jeffes' passing.

Track listing
All music composed by Simon Jeffes except as indicated.

"Scherzo And Trio" – 6:55
"Lifeboat (Lovers Rock)" – 7:15 
"Nothing Really Blue" – 5:17 
"Cage Dead" – 4:33
"Vega" – 10:20
"Yodel 3" – 3:25
"Organum" – 3:47
"Another One From Porlock" – 2:58
"Thorn Tree Wind" – 3:14
"Silver Star Of Bologna" – 4:05
"Discover America" (Traditional) – 3:02 
"Pythagoras On The Line" – 1:50
"Kora Kora" – 3:04
"Lie Back And Think Of England" – 4:21
"Red Shorts" – 4:06
"Passing Through" – 5:28

Personnel
Khakberdy Allamurdov – drums
Barbara Bolte – cor Anglais
Belinda Bunt - violin
Roger Chase – viola soloist
Paul Cullington – bass
Steve Fletcher – piano
Roger Garland – violin
Wilf Gibson – violin
Roy Gillard – violin
Tim Good – violin
Simon Jeffes – arranger, bass, cuatro, guitar, harmonium, mandolin, omnichord, percussion, piano, Prophet 5, viola, violin
Paul Kegg – cello
Nigel Kennedy – violin
Patrick Kiernan – violin
Boguslav Kostecki – violin
Kurban Kurbanov – accordion
Chris Laurence – bass
Helen Liebmann – cello, soloist
Martin Loveday – cello
Ian Maidman – bass, percussion
Rita Manning – violin
Peter McGowan – violin
James McLeod – violin
Peter Oxer – violin
Tony Pleeth – cello
Neil Rennie – ukulele
Geoffrey Richardson – cello, clarinet, viola
Sabir Rizaev – clarinet, soprano saxophone
George Robertson – viola
Roger Smith – cello
Stephen Tees – viola
Kathryn Tickell – Northumbrian smallpipes
Naná Vasconcelos – clay pot
Annie Whitehead – trombone
Barry Wilde – violin
Katie Wilkinson Khoroshunin – viola
Gavyn Wright – soloist, violin

References

1993 albums
Penguin Cafe Orchestra albums
Albums produced by Simon Jeffes